NBA TV Philippines is a Philippine pay television sports-oriented network owned by MediaQuest Holdings through its subsidiary Cignal TV. The channel is a joint venture between Cignal and NBA TV and is a live simulcast broadcast of NBA TV, the league's dedicated channel in the United States.

Features
NBA TV Philippines is the sister channel of One Sports, One Sports+, PBA Rush, and UAAP Varsity Channel, but the channel is slated to air more games and NBA-content than its sister channel or TV5 (free TV partner).

History
Upon the expiration of the decade-long contract of Solar and NBA, Sky of ABS-CBN Corporation and Cignal TV of TV5 Philippines in their joint statement said that they were jointly negotiating directly with the NBA to make games and programming available to millions of fans in the Philippines. However, Sky and ABS-CBN 
Corporation later dropped out of the bid due to its issue on legislative franchise renewal which led both ABS-CBN and its sister station, an all-sports channel S+A ceased broadcast on free-to-air television on May 5, 2020, as well as the dissolution of its sports division on August 31, 2020, as part of the company's retrenchment after the denial of its franchise renewal, leaving Cignal as a sole bidder.

On the start of the 2019-20 NBA season, the NBA was left without broadcast partner in the Philippines, they temporarily streamed their games in the NBA Philippines page via Facebook Watch and Twitter, it was only on November 16 when NBA temporarily went onto an agreement with CNN Philippines to air their games albeit only on weekends, the broadcast of games continued throughout the 2020 NBA All-Star Game.

After months of negotiations on July 27, 2020, Cignal TV announced the multi-year partnership deal with the NBA, on the announcement it was also mentioned that the provider will launch the channel along with the airing of games through its free-to-air channels, TV5 and One Sports. The channel was launched on July 31, 2020, the same day when the NBA's restart of the current season started (July 30 in Orlando time).

Cignal plans to offer the channel for syndication to other cable operators.

In addition, Smart Communications will provide a livestreaming of NBA TV Philippines on Smart's official website for Smart prepaid and TNT subscribers with GigaVideo subscription, as well as for Smart Signature postpaid subscribers. The livestream, however, is separate from the league's own streaming service NBA League Pass.

See also
TV5
One Sports (sports division)
One Sports (TV channel)
PBA Rush
UAAP Varsity Channel
5 Plus (defunct channel)
AKTV (defunct programming block)
Hyper (defunct channel)
NBA Premium TV (defunct channel)
Basketball TV (defunct channel)
NBA League Pass

References

TV5 Network channels
Television channels and stations established in 2020
Television networks in the Philippines
Sports television networks in the Philippines
English-language television stations in the Philippines
Cignal TV
National Basketball Association on television